Al Koot Fort most commonly known as the Doha Fort, is a historical military fortress located in the heart of Doha, Qatar's capital city. It was built in 1927 by Sheikh Abdulla bin Qassim Al Thani, better known as Sheikh Abdullah bin Jassim Al Thani, who ruled Qatar from 1913 until 1949, after Sheikh Mohammed bin Jassim Al Thani, Sheikh Abdullah's brother, abdicated in favor of him. The fort was later converted into a museum.

Qatari traditional handicrafts, products and photos of daily life with illustrations are housed in the fort. Exhibits and artworks include handicrafts, gypsum and wooden ornaments, fishing equipment and boats, historical photos and paintings including oil paintings of craft workers and daily life.

History

The Al Koot Fort was rebuilt in 1927 by Sheikh Abdulla bin Qassim Al Thani, after it was abandoned by the Ottomans. It was originally built to serve as a police station in 1880 and afterwards used as a jail in 1906, although some sources prove that the Al Koot Fort was built by Sheikh Abdulla to protect the Souq Waqif from notorious thieves.it was also renovated in 1978.It was one of the most important forts during that time.

Geography

The Al Koot Fort is located in the Al Bidda neighborhood, in the midst of the famous Souq Waqif, near Doha Corniche, and is now a preferred landmark, museum and tourist spot, most especially for foreigners.

See also
Zubarah Fort
Barzan Tower

References

External links
Al Koot fort | Qatar Visitor - Travel Guide to Doha & Qatar

Forts in Qatar
1927 establishments in Qatar